Habragonum amamioshimense is a species of beetle in the family Carabidae, the only species in the genus Habragonum.

References

Platyninae